Hinnerk Schönemann (born 30 November 1974) is a German actor. He has appeared in more than ninety films since 1998.

Filmography

References

External links 

1974 births
Living people
German male film actors
People from Rostock